Robert Menzies (born 3 April 1946) is an Australian water polo player. He competed in the men's tournament at the 1972 Summer Olympics.

References

1946 births
Living people
Australian male water polo players
Olympic water polo players of Australia
Water polo players at the 1972 Summer Olympics
Place of birth missing (living people)